The 2014 season was the Hawthorn Football Club's 90th season in the Australian Football League and 113th overall. Hawthorn entered the season as the defending AFL Premiers.

Overview
Following speculation throughout the 2013 season, Lance Franklin announced on 1 October 2013 that he was going to leave the club to join the Sydney Swans on a nine-year, multimillion-dollar contract as a free agent. Hawthorn subsequently received pick 19 in the AFL Draft as compensation, despite the club requesting a higher draft pick from the AFL. In March, draftee Dayle Garlett resigned from the club, citing homesickness and being unable to cope with the demands of AFL football and training.

Playing list changes 
The following lists all player changes between the conclusion of the 2013 season and the beginning of the 2014 season.

Trades

Free Agency

Departures

Draft

AFL draft

Rookie draft

Retirements and delistings

2014 player squad

Fixture

Pre-season

Premiership season

Ladder

Finals series

Awards, Records & Milestones

Awards
 J.J. Liston Trophy - Alex Woodward while playing for the Hawthorn affiliate, Box Hill Football Club.
 2014 All-Australian team selection - Jarryd Roughead, Jordan Lewis & Luke Breust
 Norm Smith Medal - Luke Hodge
 Peter Crimmins Medal - Jordan Lewis

Records
 Round 3 - Jack Gunston kicks Hawthorn's 24,000th goal in VFL/AFL competition.
 Round 4 - Hawthorn's largest winning margin against  (99 points)
 Round 7 - Hawthorn's largest winning margin against  (145 points)
 Round 13 - Hawthorn's 900th win since joining the VFL/AFL in 1925.

Milestones
Round  1 - Ben McEvoy - played first AFL game for Hawthorn.
Round  1 - Derick Wanganeen - played his first AFL game.
Round  1 - Tim O'Brien - played his first AFL game.
Round  2 - Angus Litherland - played his first AFL game.
Round  2 - Josh Gibson - played his 150th AFL game
Round  3 - David Hale - played his 200th AFL game.
Round  5 - Mitch Hallahan - played his first AFL game.
Round  6 - Shaun Burgoyne - played his 250th AFL game.
Round  6 - Sam Mitchell - played his 250th AFL game.
Round  7 - Jordan Lewis - played his 200th AFL game.
Round  7 - Billy Hartung - played his first AFL game.
Round 10 - Alastair Clarkson - sets club record of 222 consecutive games as coach.
Round 11 - Brendon Bolton - first game as senior coach.
Round 12 - Luke Lowden - played his first AFL game.
Round 13 - Ben Ross - played first AFL game for Hawthorn.
Round 14 - Shaun Burgoyne - played his 100th AFL game for Hawthorn.
Round 14 - Jarryd Roughead - kicked his 400th goal in his AFL career.
Round 18 - Ben McEvoy - played his 100th AFL game.
Round 18 - Jarryd Roughead - played his 200th AFL game.
Round 18 - Alex Woodward - played his first AFL game.
Round 19 - Jarryd Roughead - kicked his 50th goal for this season.
Round 21 - Luke Breust - kicked his 50th goal for this season.
Round 23 - Jack Gunston - kicked his 50th goal for this season.
Round 23 - David Hale - kicked his 200th career goal.
Qualifying Final - Brad Sewell - played his 200th AFL game.
Qualifying Final - Liam Shiels - played his 100th AFL game.
Preliminary Final - Bradley Hill - played his 50th AFL game.
Preliminary Final - Matthew Spangher - played his 50th AFL game.
Grand Final - Luke Hodge - played his 250th AFL game.

Brownlow Medal

Results

Brownlow Medal tally

 italics denotes ineligible player

Tribunal cases

Notes
"Points" refers to carry-over points accrued following the sanction. For example, 154.69 points draw a one-match suspension, with 54.69 carry-over points (for every 100 points, a one-match suspension is given).

References

Hawthorn Football Club Season, 2014
Hawthorn Football Club seasons